A price limit is an established amount in which a price may increase or decrease in any single trading day from the previous day's settlement price.

In financial and commodity markets, prices are only permitted to rise or fall by a certain number of ticks (or by a certain percentage) per trading session. Similarly, index futures are often permitted to move a certain amount before the cash market opens.

References 

Financial markets